Aquinas Institute of Theology is a Roman Catholic graduate school and seminary in St. Louis, Missouri. It was founded by the Dominican Order and is sponsored by the Province of St. Albert the Great.

Academics
The institute offers a number of graduate degrees in theology and ministry, including a Master of Arts in Theology (M.A.), a Master of Divinity (M.Div.), and a Master of Arts in Pastoral Studies (MAPS).

Aquinas Institute is accredited by the Association of Theological Schools in the United States and Canada.

Community offerings
In addition to its academic programs Aquinas Institute offers several community programs.

History
1900 - The Dominican Order decides not to expand the House of Studies in Washington, D.C., founding a new House of Studies in River Forest, Illinois.

1912 - The Master General of the Dominican Order makes the House of Studies a Studium Generale. He also formally establishes the Central Province of St. Albert the Great, and the school is intended primarily to prepare the province's members for priesthood. The Studium Generale operates from 1939 to 1951.

1923 - The Studium faculty moves to the campus of the Dominican College of St. Rose of Lima in Dubuque, Iowa, and experiences a period of rapid change.

1956 - The two Dominican colleges, St. Rose of Lima and the Studium Generale, are incorporated as one, the Aquinas Institute of Philosophy and Theology.

1964 - Aquinas Institute is accredited by the North Central Association of Colleges and Secondary Schools.

1965 - The Association of Theological Schools of Iowa is formed, the first ecumenical consortium established in the country.

1967 - The first women students begin their studies.

1968 - Aquinas Institute becomes one of the first five Catholic schools to enter the Association of Theological Schools in the United States and Canada and to be accredited by it.

1981 - Aquinas Institute of Theology moves to St. Louis, Missouri, where it enters into a "Cooperative Project for Theological Education" with Saint Louis University, on whose campus it resides. During that time, the school inaugurates the Great Preacher Award (awarded to an outstanding homilist in the St. Louis area), the Catherine of Siena Excellence in Ministry Award (awarded to a layman who has contributed through ministerial work), and the annual Aquinas Lecture (given by leading theologians on current topics in theology).  The Dubuque campus is sold to Emmaus Bible College.

2005 - The school moves again, this time to a former factory in Midtown St. Louis, built in 1903 to house the Standard Adding Machine Company, which prospered with the invention of a 10-key adding machine. The renovation of the building was part of a larger urban renovation project which includes residential and commercial space.

References

 
Catholic seminaries in the United States
Dominican universities and colleges in the United States
Universities and colleges in St. Louis
Educational institutions established in 1939
1939 establishments in Missouri
Catholic universities and colleges in Missouri
Roman Catholic Archdiocese of St. Louis
Seminaries and theological colleges in Missouri